Smile (stylized as SMiLE) is an unfinished album by the American rock band the Beach Boys that was planned to follow their 11th studio album, Pet Sounds (1966).  It was to be a 12-track LP, with each track edited together from interchangeable fragments, similar to the group's 1966 single "Good Vibrations". Instead, after a year of recording, the album was shelved and the group released a downscaled version, Smiley Smile, in September 1967. Over the next four decades, few of the original Smile tracks were officially released, and the project came to be regarded as the most legendary unreleased album in popular music history.

The album was produced and almost entirely composed by Brian Wilson with guest lyricist and assistant arranger Van Dyke Parks, both of whom conceived the project as a riposte to the British sensibilities that had dominated popular music of the era. Wilson touted Smile as a "teenage symphony to God" to surpass Pet Sounds. It was a concept album that was planned to feature word paintings, tape manipulation, elaborate vocal arrangements, experiments with musical acoustics, and comedic interludes, with influences drawn from mysticism, traditional pop, doo-wop, jazz, ragtime, musique concrète, classical, American history, poetry, and cartoons. Over 50 hours of tape was produced from the sessions, ranging from musical and spoken word to sound effects and role-playing. The lead single would have been "Heroes and Villains", a Western musical comedy, or "Vega-Tables", a satire of physical fitness.

Numerous issues, including legal entanglements with Capitol Records, Wilson's uncompromising perfectionism and mental instabilities, as well as Parks' withdrawal from the project in early 1967, prevented the album's completion. Most of the backing tracks were produced between August and December 1966, but few vocals were ever recorded, and the album's structure was never finalized. Afraid of the public's reaction to his work, Wilson blocked attempts to finish Smile in the subsequent years. From 1968 onward, only three more tracks ("Our Prayer", "Cabinessence" and "Surf's Up") were finished by the group. As its legend grew, the project's unfulfilled potential inspired many fans and musicians, particularly those in indie rock, post-punk, and chamber pop genres.

Since the 1980s, Smile session recordings circulated widely on bootlegs, allowing fans to assemble hypothetical versions of a finished album, adding to its legacy as an interactive project. Responding to this, Capitol included a loose reconstruction of the album on the 1993 box set Good Vibrations. In 2004, Wilson, Parks, and Darian Sahanaja arranged a version of Smile for concert performances, titled Brian Wilson Presents Smile, which Wilson then adapted into a solo album. He stated that this version differed substantially from his original vision.  The 2011 compilation The Smile Sessions was the first official package devoted to the original Beach Boys' recordings and included an approximation of the completed album. It received universal acclaim and won Best Historical Album at the 55th Grammy Awards.

Background

In late 1964, as Brian Wilson's industry profile grew, he became acquainted with various individuals from around the Los Angeles music scene. He also took an increasing interest in recreational drugs (particularly marijuana, LSD, and Desbutal). According to his then-wife Marilyn, Wilson's new friends "had the gift of gab[...] All of a sudden [Brian] was in Hollywood—these people talk a language that was fascinating to him. Anybody that was different and talked cosmic or whatever[...] he liked it." Wilson's closest friend in this period was Loren Schwartz, an aspiring talent agent that he met at a recording studio. Schwartz introduced Wilson to marijuana and LSD, as well as a wealth of literature commonly read by college students. During his first LSD trip, Wilson had what he considered to be "a very religious experience" and claimed to have seen God.

In November 1965, early in the sessions for the Beach Boys' 11th studio LP Pet Sounds, Wilson began experimenting with the idea of recording an album focused on humor and laughter. He was intent on making Pet Sounds a complete departure from previous Beach Boys releases and did not wish to work with his usual lyricist, Mike Love. Instead, he worked with jingle writer Tony Asher on most of the album's songs. On February 17, 1966, Wilson began tracking their song "Good Vibrations", which was intended for Pet Sounds but omitted due to Wilson's dissatisfaction with the recording. He attempted a couple different arrangements of the track from then until April.

Wilson stated at the time that he "wanted to write [songs] with more than one level. Eventually, I would like to see longer singles—so that the song can be more meaningful. A song can, for instance, have movements—in the same way as a classical concerto—only capsulized." Starting with the fourth session held for "Good Vibrations", on May 4, he began recording the song in sections, rather than tracking the full piece all the way through, with the intention of later splicing the fragments into a composite track.

Released on May 16, Pet Sounds was massively influential, containing sophisticated orchestral arrangements that raised the band's prestige to the top level of rock innovators. In the US, the album confused their fans and sold worse than previous Beach Boys releases, but in the UK, the reception was highly favorable. The UK success emboldened Wilson to take greater creative risks and helped convince the band's label, Capitol Records, to fund and promote his next project, however ambitious it may be.

Creative circle

Collaboration with Parks

In 1966, Wilson attended a party held at the home of the Byrds' record producer Terry Melcher. There, he was introduced to Van Dyke Parks, a 23-year-old professional songwriter, arranger, session musician, and former child actor.  Parks had moved to Los Angeles a few years earlier, hoping to compose the scores to Disney films, but instead lent his services to the Byrds and MGM pop groups the Mojo Men and Harper's Bizarre. During this meeting, Wilson noticed that Parks had an unusually articulate manner of speaking. Wilson had been searching for a new lyricist, and soon after, approached Parks with the offer to write lyrics for the Beach Boys' next album. Parks had worries, having heard that Asher had dissociated himself from Wilson and the Beach Boys, but nonetheless agreed to collaborate.

Between July and September, Wilson and Parks wrote many songs together at Wilson's Beverly Hills home for the upcoming project, tentatively called Dumb Angel. Writing sessions may have also extended to October or November. Aside from playing on some of the Smile recording dates, Parks' contributions were limited to writing words to Wilson's melodies. He said: "I had no input whatsoever in the music. I was a total lyricist and sometimes an instrumentalist." Like Asher, Parks had minimal experience as a lyricist, and Wilson had little prior knowledge of his collaborator's musical background.

Parks implied in various interviews that he and Wilson shared an understanding of the album's Americana thematic, but in 2005, he wrote a response to a New York Review of Books article that stated otherwise ("Manifest Destiny, Plymouth Rock, etc. were the last things on his mind when he asked me to take a free hand in the lyrics and the album's thematic direction"). In a 2004 article, journalist Geoffrey Himes stated that although Parks did not write any of the music, he did collaborate with Wilson on the arrangements.

Wilson's associates

Having withdrawn from the Beach Boys' concert tours, Wilson placed distance between himself and his bandmates, and continued to involve more people in his social, business, and creative affairs. As biographer Steven Gaines wrote, his circle soon "enlarged to encompass a whole new crowd. Some of these people were 'drainers', [but others] were talented and industrious". During the Smile era, Wilson's coterie included:

 David Anderle, an MGM Records talent scout who was nicknamed "the mayor of hip" by the underground press. He initially met Wilson in 1965 through a family member. Gaines credits Anderle as the primary conduit between Wilson and the "hip" associates surrounding him. 
 Danny Hutton, a singer that Parks had performed with at The Troubador in 1964. He and Wilson first met in late 1964; they became further acquainted after being reintroduced by Hutton's manager, Anderle, in late 1965. Hutton also introduced Parks to Anderle, who soon became Parks' manager as well.
 Derek Taylor, former press officer for the Beatles. He had been the Beach Boys' publicist since March 1966. Taylor said he was hired to take the band to "a new plateau", and to that end, he spearheaded a media campaign that proclaimed Wilson to be a "genius".
 Mark Volman, singer from the Turtles. He was introduced to Wilson by Hutton and has rarely spoken about his association with Wilson because it had "always made me feel like a groupie for Brian".
Many of these people became mainstays at Wilson's home and during studio sessions. Various journalists were also arranged to accompany Wilson in and out of the studio. They included:
 Michael Vosse, a magazine reporter who had been friends with Anderle in college. Parks introduced Vosse to Wilson, and Taylor arranged for Vosse to interview Wilson for the forthcoming release of "Good Vibrations". The day after their meeting, Wilson called Vosse and offered him a job recording sounds of nature.
 Paul Jay Robbins, from the Los Angeles Free Press. Robbins was a New Left political activist who reported on and participated in the 1966 Sunset Strip riots. He met Parks through attending Byrds concerts, and Parks in turn brought Robbins into Wilson's fold.
Paul Williams, the 18-year-old founder and editor of Crawdaddy! Williams stated that he had been impressed by Pet Sounds and "Good Vibrations", and subsequently  "found my way to Brian's mansion at Christmas 1966[...] and eventually made my way back to New York to spread the word, like other journalists before and after me."
Jules Siegel, from The Saturday Evening Post. He was introduced to Wilson by Anderle and subsequently accompanied Wilson at his home and in the studio for two months.

The album held a grandiose importance among those involved, as Anderle said, "Smile was going to be a monument. That's the way we talked about it, as a monument." Commenting on the reliability of figures such as Anderle, Siegel, and Vosse, journalist Nick Kent wrote that their claims are oftentimes "so lavish [that] one can be forgiven, if only momentarily, for believing that Brian Wilson had, at that time orbited out to the furthermost reaches of the celestial stratosphere for the duration of this starcrossed project." Gaines acknowledged that the "events surrounding the album differed so much according to each person's point of view, that no one can be certain [of the facts]." Williams acknowledged that he, Wilson, Anderle, Parks, Taylor, and other journalists were "very stoned" and that perhaps "had some effect on our assessment of what was going on."

Group photo

On October 22, 1966, Wilson accompanied the touring group to Michigan to supervise their first live performance of "Good Vibrations". Upon his return to Los Angeles, he requested that his wife arrange a photo shoot and ask many of his friends and acquaintances to meet him at LAX. Approximately thirty people attended the shoot, including Hutton, Parks, Vosse, Siegel, Volman, David and Sheryl Anderle, Dean Torrence, Diane Rovell, Annie Hinsche Wilson, Dick and Carol Maider, June Fairchild, and Terry Sachen, as well as cousins and friends of the Wilson family. Guy Webster was the photographer.

The photo later became well-known among fans for its historical significance. Gaines writes, "For the next few months a giant blowup of the photograph hung on Brian's living room wall. In just as much time, all of the people in the photograph would become strangers." Biographer Peter Ames Carlin noted that the photograph took on "symbolic importance, as if it marked the point at which Brian's astonishing creative arc leveled off, nosing slowly toward a descent." Hutton recalled that Brian "never said to me why he was doing that. I didn't sense, at the time, that it was the end of anything. It was just another crazy night."

Inspiration and concept

Overlap with other Brother Records projects

Wilson originally planned many different projects, such as a sound effects collage, a comedy album, and a "health food" album. Capitol did not support some of these ideas, which led to the Beach Boys' desire to form their own label, Brother Records. Plans for the label began in August 1966 with Anderle at the head. In a press release, he stated that Brother Records was to give "entirely new concepts to the recording industry, and to give the Beach Boys total creative and promotional control over their product." Anderle later said that the label was for releasing projects that were "special" for Brian, and there was initially no concern over whether the label's products would be distributed by Capitol.

Anderle said that it was "really important" to make the point that "Brian was so creative at this time [that] it was impossible to try to tie things up[...] we were talking about doing humor albums[...] there was the Smile talk[...] there was 'The Elements' talk.[...] the humor concept was separate from Smile, originally.[...] Smile was going to be the culmination of all of Brian's intellectual occupations." Journalist Tom Nolan later reported that Wilson's "incredible fantasies" included "an album of music built from sound effects[...] chords spliced together through a whole LP". Nolan commented that when Wilson momentarily shifted his focus to films, it had seemed to be "a step easier to capturing more. If you couldn't get a sound from a carrot, you could show a carrot. He would really liked to have made music that was a carrot."

American identity

Smile was to be explicitly American in style and subject as a riposte to the British sensibilities that had dominated rock music of the era. Wilson stated that, with Smile, he intended to "'Americanize' early America and mid-America" similar to how George Gershwin "Americanized" jazz and classical music. To Parks, Gershwin's 1924 composition "Rhapsody in Blue" represented a "musical kaleidoscope" of America, a quality that he and Wilson sought to emulate.

Parks said that they "kind of wanted to investigate [...] American images. [...] Everyone was hung up and obsessed with everything totally British. So we decided to take a gauche route that we took, which was to explore American slang, and that's what we got." Further on the subject, he explained, "Everybody else was getting their snout in the British trough. Everybody wanted to sing 'bettah'', affecting these transatlantic accents and trying to sound like the Beatles. I was with a man who couldn't do that. He just didn't have that option. He was the last man standing."

In a 2004 interview, Wilson mentioned that while the 1965 album Rubber Soul had inspired him to match the artistic standards of the Beatles for Pet Sounds, "Smile wasn't the same kind of thing; it wasn't anything like The Beatles. It wasn't pop music; it was something more advanced." Numerous writers state that Wilson intended Smile as a response to the Beatles' August 1966 release Revolver. In examining many books, documentaries, and articles about the subject, music journalist Andrew Sacher states that Wilson himself "never seems to mention Revolver", possibly because his "main goal in late 1966 was topping his own Pet Sounds". Asked in a 1969 interview about the influence of Revolver on Wilson, Mike Love stated that the record did not impact Wilson's music, adding that "Brian was in his own world, believe me."

Humor and mysticism

Smile was inspired by Wilson's growing fascination with matters such as astrology, numerology and the occult. Wilson described himself as an avid reader after a friend had introduced him to Pickwick Bookshop, a Hollywood bookstore. "I started reading too many books. If I'd stuck with just a few, I'd have been all right, but I read so many authors it got crazy.[...] I went through a thing of having too many paths to choose from and of wanting to do everything and not being able to do it all." According to an unnamed participant, "If you came up to the house and introduced something new to Brian's thought processes—astrology, a different way to think about the relationship of Russia to China, anything at all—if all of a sudden he was into that, it would find its way into the music. You could hear a bit and say, 'I know where that feeling came from.'"

Many firsthand and secondary accounts support that Wilson owned books that encompassed poetry, prose, cultural criticism (Arthur Koestler's 1964-published The Act of Creation was often cited by Wilson), and "diverse expressions of non-Christian religions and belief systems" such as Hinduism (from the Bhagavad Gita), Confucianism (from the I Ching or Book of Changes), Buddhism, and Subud. Much of this counter-cultural literature promoted related practices that Wilson was further interested by, such as meditation and vegetarianism.

In a 2005 interview, Wilson stated that his studying of metaphysics was "crucial" and referenced The Act of Creation as "the big one for me". He said that the book "turned me on to very special things", specifically, "that people attach their egos to their sense of humor before anything else." Anderle said that Wilson was fixated on humor and spirituality, and "had a real innate sense of spiritualism without the knowledgeable part that you learn by reading.[...] Whatever manifestation it took was whatever it was. There was numerology for a while; there was astrology for a while. Then we got into the I Ching." Vosse said that he was told by Wilson "that he felt laughter was one of the highest forms of divinity[...] And Brian felt that it was time to do a humor album." He opined that Smile, had it been completed, would have been "basically a Southern California, non-country oriented, gospel album—on a very sophisticated level—because that's what he was doing, his own form of revival music".

Jules Siegel famously recalled that, during one evening in October, Wilson announced to his wife and friends that he was "writing a teenage symphony to God". According to Siegel, Wilson felt he was moving into a "white spiritual sound" that he thought represented the future of music. In November 1966, Nolan reported that Wilson's shift in artistic focus was inspired by his psychedelic experience from the year prior. Asked where he believed music would go, Wilson responded: "White spirituals, I think that's what we're going to hear. Songs of faith."

In late 1966, Wilson commented that Dumb Angel had been a working title for the album and explained that the name was discarded because the group wanted to go with something "more cheery". In February 1967, Carl offered that the title Smile was chosen because the group was focusing on spirituality and "the concept of spreading goodwill, good thoughts and happiness". Carlin wrote that the Dumb Angel title may have been inspired by hallucinations Wilson saw while composing late at night under the influence of Desbutals. In 2004 interviews, Wilson denied that Smile was influenced by LSD, Zen, or religion. Anderle also denied that drugs were an influence on Wilson's artistic pursuits. Parks said that Wilson envisioned Smile as experimenting with "the mind-expanding possibilities of music and the mind-expanding properties of drugs".

Themes and lyricism

Although Smile is a concept album, the surviving recordings do not lend themselves to any formal narrative development, only to themes and experiences. According to Heiser, there is also a wealth of material that appears to have "little, if anything to do with [an] Americana theme". Other themes involved physical fitness, childhood, and the natural environment. Web journal Freaky Trigger states: "While the lyrics are usually pretty damned literary, at their most extreme, they're divorced from any kind of meaning in the straightforward sense." Parks rebuked the suggestion that Smile was planned as a concept album and said that the work was only envisioned "to use the American vernacular at a time when there was a lot of soundalike Beatle-esque music around."

By contrast, musicologist Philip Lambert describes Smile as "an American history lesson seen through the eyes of a time-travelling bicycle rider on a journey from Plymouth Rock to Hawaii." Documentarian Keith Badman states that Wilson intended the album to be an American-themed exploration of the innocence of youth and childhood.  Williams concluded that it was to be "perhaps the story of the unnatural love affair between one man's voice and a harpsichord". A melodic and rhythmic motif (sometimes called the "Bicycle Rider" theme) was configured into several tracks, which he said "[broke] down the walls that give songs identities without ever offering conceptual ('rock opera') explanation or resolution."

Parks' lyrics employed wordplay, allusions, and quotations. He acknowledged that there were occasional "references" to specific historical entities, however, "I don't think that I was interested in wordplay as much as I was interested in the power of words." References to American history range from the emergence of railroads and automobiles to Western colonialism and its impact on Native American tribes. Scholar Darren Reid interpreted the focus on older American themes as a self-conscious, deeper reflection on the hedonistic, modern Americana of the Beach Boys' earlier songs. He said that, despite Wilson's later claims that the album was about humor and happiness, "the resultant album does not radiate predominately happy mood.[...] Perhaps the smile Wilson refers to is an ironic one[...] Humour, sarcasm, and lonely introspection are the contrasts that hold Smile together."

Some songs followed themes related to God and childhood, namely "Wonderful", "Child Is Father of the Man", and "Surf's Up". Only "Wonderful" referred to God explicitly. Parks supported that his associations with the spiritual aspect of Wilson's work were "inescapable", but professed that he disliked writing lyrics that dealt with religious belief, believing it gave the appearance of "trying to be uppity". In his recollection, "There's a lot of things about belief in Smile, and its very question of belief is what was plaguing Brian at that time. What should we keep from the structure that we had, the hard-wiring that we had with religion? He had religion beat into him, and I did in my own way, too. So there's a lot of thinking about belief."

Asked what words come to mind when listening to Smile in 2011, Wilson replied, "Childhood. Freedom. A rejection of adult rules and adult conformity. Our message was, 'Adults keep out. This is about the spirit of youth.'" In another interview that year, he questioned a journalist how they would categorize Smile. They responded with "impressionistic psychedelic folk rock", and said that while most rock seems to be about adulthood, Smile "expresses what it's like to be a kid in an impressionistic way" and "depicts the psychedelic magic of childhood", to which Wilson replied: "I love that. You coin those just right."

Carter summarized that Smiles subject matter engaged with matters related to history, culture, and society while also traversing "complex landscapes of faith: from national allegiance and ideological persuasion to religious belief and spiritual devotion." He argued that "Smile picks up where Pet Sounds left off", expanding the introspective themes of Pet Sounds into "an exploration of the nation's historical, social, ideological, and cultural identity." In his view, the lyrics also espouse "an antiestablishment skepticism toward religious institutions", "an interest in alternative belief structures", and "exceptionalist leanings".

Composition and production

Modular approach

In the 1960s, it was common for pop music to be recorded in a single take, but the Beach Boys' approach differed. Since 1964, Wilson had performed tape splices on his recordings, usually to allow difficult vocal sections to be performed by the group. By 1966, "Good Vibrations" had established Wilson's compositional approach for Smile. Instead of working on whole songs with "clear large-scale syntactical structures", he limited himself to recording short interchangeable fragments (or "modules"). Through the method of tape splicing, each fragment could then be assembled into a linear sequence, allowing any number of larger structures and divergent moods to be produced at a later time. A similar fragmentary approach is common in film editing, albeit under the term "dangling causes".

Parks said that he and Wilson were conscious of musique concrete and that they "were trying to make something of it". Heiser called the album's use of jumpcuts a "striking characteristic" and said that they "must be acknowledged as compositional statements in themselves, giving the music a sonic signature every bit as noticeable as the performances themselves. There was no way this music could be 'real'. Wilson was therefore echoing the techniques of musique concrète and seemed to be breaking the audio 'fourth wall'—if there can said to be such a thing." He interpreted the methodology of using modules as consistent with the album's conceptual thread, "a return to the pre-grammatical, non-linear and analogical (as opposed to logical) thinking of early childhood – they are artefacts of play." Ethnomusicologist David Toop countered that "modular" "suggests discrete components that interlock" and offered "cellular" as a possibly more accurate term.

The material was continuously revised, rewritten, and rearranged on a daily basis. Anderle recalled examples: "The beginning of 'Cabin Essence' becomes the middle of 'Vega-Tables', or the ending becomes the bridge. I would beg Brian not to change a piece of music because it was too fantastic. But when Brian did change it, I admit it was equally beautiful." Some of the songs were fully-composed with obvious verse-chorus structures (including "Heroes and Villains" and "Surf's Up") while other songs were short segments designed to illustrate a mood or a setting. Due to the fragmentary and never-finalized nature of the recordings, it is ambiguous when and where most Smile songs begin and end.

In the mid-1960s, trialing mixes required the physical act of cutting tape reels (with razor blades) and splicing them together. Creating an entire LP that relied on these processes proved too challenging for Wilson. Engineer Mark Linett argued that Wilson's ambitions were implausible to fulfill with pre-digital technology, especially with "the infinite number of possible ways you could assemble this puzzle." His colleague Alan Boyd shared the same view, stating that the tape editing "would have been probably an unbearably arduous, difficult and tedious task".

Orchestrations and arrangements

About fifty hours of tape was produced from the Smile sessions and encompassed musical and spoken word to sound effects and role playing. Many of the modules were composed as word paintings and invoked visual concepts or physical entities. According to Toop, during the mid-1960s, Wilson's style was akin to "cartoon music and Disney influence mutating into avant-garde pop". Heiser argues that attempting to summarize the whole of Smile is "a pointless exercise" and that it is preferable to write of "the many musical inhabitants of this complex, nebulous macrocosm." He lists several of these through the following descriptions:

The music itself carried on the "harmonic ingenuity" of Pet Sounds, and in the belief of academic Dave Carter, "it makes little point to distinguish between the two albums in terms of their differential impact." With Smile, Wilson's orchestrations emphasized traditional American instruments such as banjo, steel guitar, fiddle, mandolin, harmonica, and tack piano. Other instruments included "precipitate brass like a Tibetan horn", muted (with tape) piano, baritone guitar and upright bass played in a tic-tac style, dobro, bouzouki, and bass harmonica. There was also a greater complexity to Wilson's compositions. Al Jardine said that the music became "more textural, more complex and it had a lot more vocal movement.[...] With ['Good Vibrations'] and other songs on Smile, we began to get into more esoteric kind of chord changes, and mood changes and movement. You'll find Smile full of different movements and vignettes. Each movement had its own texture and required its own session."" As with Pet Sounds, Smile featured a more unique sense of rhythm relative to the band's earlier records.

Harpsichords and tack piano (typically played in unison) feature prominently, as well as mallets and "quirky/echoey percussion". Parks said that the "first thing I can remember in the studio" with Wilson was his use of "tuneful percussion, like a piano or a Chinese gong", which reminded Parks of early 20th-century orchestrations by men such as Percy Grainger, particularly Grainger's arrangement of "Country Gardens". Priore noted that a "flair for exotica" can be heard in "Holidays", "Wind Chimes", "Love to Say Dada", and "Child Is Father of the Man". Heiser observed that "playful" and "colorful" moods – which he likens to the music of Sesame Street – are consistent throughout the recordings.

The vocal arrangements, according to Heiser, use "a wide range of pitch centres, antiphonal effects, rhythmic variations, juxtapositions of legato and staccato figures, rounders-like echoes, and vocal effects not usually associated with mid-sixties rock records." Academic Brian Torff commented that Smile contained "choral arranging" and a "rhapsodic Broadway element". Toop wrote that the Smile vocals "willfully regresses into baby talk". Williams suggested that, "for the most part", Smile "uses words the same way it uses strings and keyboards—for their sounds." Freaky Trigger concurred that "the line between the sung word and mere sound become criss-crossed and blurred again and again and again[...] where the word becomes subservient to sound, which is only six or so steps on the road to sound-for-the-sake-of-sound". The journal considers comparisons with the work of Sun Ra and John Cage, and concludes that this was a reconfiguration of doo-wop, a genre that the Beach Boys were rooted in.

Psychedelic musical characteristics distinguished the Beach Boys' mid-1960s work, particularly through the group's invocation of "greater fluidity, elaboration, and formal complexity", "a cultivation of sonic textures", "the introduction of new (combinations of) instruments, multiple keys, and/or floating tonal centers", and the occasional use of "slower, more hypnotic tempos". Guardian critic Alexis Petridis wrote that until the negative effects of LSD surfaced in rock music via Skip Spence's Oar (1969) and Syd Barrett's The Madcap Laughs (1970), "artists tactfully ignored the dark side of the psychedelic experience". He argued that Smile presented such a quality in the form of "alternately frantic and grinding mayhem" ("Fire"), "isolated, small-hours creepiness" ("Wind Chimes"), and "weird, dislocated voices" ("Love to Say Dada").

Contemporary context

Smile drew from what most rock stars of the time considered to be antiquated pop culture touchstones, like doo-wop, barbershop, ragtime, exotica, pre-rock and roll pop, and cowboy films. Some of the music incorporated chanting, forays into Indian and Hawaiian music, jazz, classical tone poems, cartoon sound effects, musique concrète, yodeling, and elements derivative of Sacred Harp, Shaker hymns, Mele, and Native American chants.  Music critic Erik Davis wrote of the album's disconnect to contemporary rock music clichés, noting that "Smile had banjos, not sitars". Wilson said he deliberately avoided traditional rock instrumentation because he wanted to employ ideas that were more "original" for Smile.   Also recorded were renditions of older songs such as "Gee", "I Wanna Be Around", "The Old Master Painter", and "You Are My Sunshine". Priore described this action as Wilson's attempt to expose "pre-'60s songwriting[...] to the psychedelic era."

Among the many "contradictory templates" Toop felt were "buried within Smile's music legacy" were Frank Sinatra, the Lettermen, the Four Freshmen, Martin Denny, Patti Page, Chuck Berry, Spike Jones, Nelson Riddle, Jackie Gleason, Phil Spector, Bob Dylan, the Penguins, and the Mills Brothers. He wrote that collaborations between Miles Davis and Gil Evans "haunt SMiLE tracks like 'Look (Song for Children)' and 'Child Is Father of the Man'", and compared the project's "explorations of acoustic phenomena" to "similar tendencies by Charles Ives, Les Baxter's thematic LPs, and Richard Maxfield's electronic experiments with insect sounds or instruments played underwater". Furthermore, he wrote that the project may be regarded as tone poems "in oblique relationship to Third Stream, that rejected dream of the late 1950s best described in Charles Mingus's term 'jazzical'". In 2004, Wilson stated that Smile was too advanced for him to consider it pop music, and said that he admired and was influenced by Johann Sebastian Bach for his ability to construct a continuum of complex music using simple forms and simple chords.

Potential contents

Tracks listed on Wilson's 1966 note
On December 15, 1966, Wilson attempted to ease Capitol's concerns over the album's delay by delivering a handwritten note that contained an unordered, preliminary track listing. Capitol prepared record sleeves that listed these songs on the reverse side with the disclaimer "see label for correct playing order". Preliminary mixes (and in some cases many) were created for several of these tracks.

"Good Vibrations"
As Wilson neared the completion of "Good Vibrations", he asked Parks to rewrite the song's lyrics, but Parks declined, as he did not wish to alienate Mike Love. The title was written several times on one of the covers prepared by Capitol in order to boost album sales.

"Heroes and Villains"

"Heroes and Villains", the first song Wilson wrote with Parks, was envisioned by Wilson as a three-minute musical comedy to surpass "Good Vibrations". He created myriad versions of the track, some of which ranged in length from six to eight minutes. Wilson came up with the title and told Parks that he thought of the Old West when he wrote the melody, which reminded Parks of the Marty Robbins song "El Paso". Parks immediately conceived the opening line: "I've been in this town so long that back in the city I've been taken for lost and gone and unknown for a long, long time."

The success of their collaboration led to them writing more songs with an Old West theme, including "Barnyard" and "I'm in Great Shape". In 1978, Wilson told biographer Byron Preiss that there was intended to be a piece called the "Barnyard Suite", which would have been "four songs in four short pieces, combined together, but we never finished that one. We got into something else."

"I'm in Great Shape"
On November 4, 1966, Brian recorded a piano demonstration of "Heroes and Villains" that included "I'm in Great Shape" and "Barnyard" as sections of the song, but on his note from December, "I'm in Great Shape" was listed as a separate track from "Heroes and Villains".

"Wind Chimes"
Marilyn said: "We went shopping one day and we brought home some wind chimes. We hung them outside the house and then one day, while Brian was sitting around he sort of watched them out the window and then he wrote the song ['Wind Chimes']. I think that's how it happened. Simple. He does a lot of things that way." In July 1967, the bass line was reworked into "Can't Wait Too Long".

"Wonderful"
The title of "Wonderful" derived from a pet name Wilson had for Marilyn. Parks identified the music as "entirely different from anything else. and I thought that it was a place, an opportunity, to begin a love song.[...] Now I thought, once we had gotten 'Heroes And Villains' done, we might have seen a boy/girl song emerge, other than 'Wonderful'. Honestly, I really thought we would do it, but I never found an opportunity to pursue that with the music I was given. Between August and December 1966, Wilson recorded three arrangements of the song, all of which were unfinished.

"Cabin Essence"

"Cabin Essence" is about railroads. Biographer Jon Stebbins deemed the song "some of the most haunting, manic, evil-sounding music the Beach Boys ever made" with its waltz chorus replete with "demonic chanting, buzzing cellos, and rail-spike pounding".

"Child Is Father of the Man"
"Child Is Father of the Man" features keyboard, trumpet, vocal rounds, and a droning guitar saturated with reverb. According to Parks, the lyric came from Wilson's "fervent desire to re-invent himself as an individual, not as a boy". The title was appropriated from William Wordsworth's poem "My Heart Leaps Up". Parks later said that other lyrics had been written for the song that were never recorded. In 2003, he wrote new lyrics to complete the song.

"Surf's Up"

"Surf's Up" is the second song Wilson and Parks started writing together. It was composed as a two-movement piece, most of it in one night while they were high on Wilson's Desbutals.  Wilson commented that the song's first chord was a minor seventh, "unlike most of our songs, which open on a major – and from there it just started building and rambling[...] when we finished it, he said, 'Let's call it "Surf's Up"', which is wild because surfing isn't related to the song at all."

Oppenheim declared on his 1967 CBS documentary that "Surf's Up" was "one aspect of new things happening in pop music today. As such, it is a symbol of the change many of these young musicians see in our future." In a self-penned 1969 article, Vosse wrote that "Surf's Up" was to be the intended ending climax of Smile, and that it would have followed a section described as a "choral amen sort of thing."

"Do You Like Worms?"

"Do You Like Worms?" is about the recolonization of the American continent. None of the lyrics mention worms. Parks later said that he did not know where the title came from and attributed it to possibly an engineer, Wilson, or Mike Love. The "bicycle rider" mentioned in the lyric is a reference to "Bicycle Rider Back" playing cards printed by the United States Playing Card Company during the 19th century. Parks commented, "A lot of people misinterpreted that, but that's OK; it's OK not to be told what to think, if you're an audience." In January 1967, the song's keyboard break melody was rerecorded as the chorus of "Heroes and Villains". In 2004, the song was retitled "Roll Plymouth Rock".

"Vega-Tables"
"Vega-Tables", according to Wilson, came from his desire "to turn people on to vegetables, good natural food, organic food. Health is an important element in spiritual enlightenment. But I do not want to be pompous about it, so we will engage in a satirical approach." It was the last Parks co-write that was recorded for the album. A module called "Do a Lot" or "Sleep a Lot" was considered for inclusion in "Heroes and Villains". In 1967, the section spun off into a piece called "Mama Says".

"The Old Master Painter"

Also known as "My Only Sunshine", the track is a medley of the standards "The Old Master Painter" and "You Are My Sunshine". Dennis Wilson sang the lead on "You Are My Sunshine". In 2005, Wilson wrote that the rendition of "The Old Master Painter" was brief because he could not remember the full song. In January 1967, the track's ending was repurposed as the ending of "Heroes and Villains", minus the "when skies are gray" vocals.

"The Elements"

"The Elements" was a conceptualized four-part movement that encompassed the four classical elements: Air, Fire, Earth, and Water. According to Anderle, Wilson "was really into the elements", so much so that he "ran up to Big Sur for a week, just 'cause he wanted to get into that, up to the mountains, into the snow, down to the beach, out to the pool, out at night, running around, to water fountains, to a lot of water, the sky, the whole thing was this fantastic amount of awareness of his surroundings. So the obvious thing was to do something that would cover the physical surroundings." To assist with the recording of this piece, Wilson instructed others to travel around with a Nagra tape recorder and record the different variations of water sounds that they could find. Vosse recalled, "I'd come by to see him every day, and he'd listen to my tapes and talk about them. I was just fascinated that he would hear things every once in a while and his ears would prick up and he'd go back and listen again. And I had no idea what he was listening for!"

"The Elements – Part 1" (also known as "Mrs. O'Leary's Cow" and commonly referred to as "Fire"). was recorded under unusual conditions. Wilson instructed a friend to purchase several dozen fire helmets at a local toy store so that everybody in the studio could don them during its recording. Wilson also had the studio's janitor bring in a bucket with burning wood so that the studio would be filled with the smell of smoke. He subsequently recorded the crackling noises made by the burning wood and mixed them into the track.

Anderle recalled that Wilson told the group "what fire was going to be, and what water was going to be; we had some idea of air. That was where it stopped. None of us had any ideas as to how it was going to tie together, except that it appeared to us to be an opera." Parks recalled that an elemental concept did not come up until later in the project.  One of the illustrations created for the album included "Vega-Tables" as part of "The Elements", but Wilson's note listed "The Elements" and "Vega-Tables" (as well as "Wind Chimes") separately. Wilson told Preiss that "Air" was an instrumental piano piece that was never finished.

Non-listed tracks

"Prayer"
"Prayer" is a wordless hymn that was intended to begin the album. Lambert describes the piece as "every technique of chromatic harmony [Wilson] had ever heard or imagined." On the session tape, Wilson announces, "This is intro to the album, take one." Jardine is heard remarking to Wilson that the piece could be considered its own track, but Wilson rejects the suggestion. This information makes "Prayer" the only track that is known to have had a definitive placement on the album.

"I Ran"
"I Ran" (also known as "Look" and originally labelled "Untitled Song #1") is a song that featured upright bass, vibraphones, keyboard, French horn, guitars, organs, trombone and woodwind. The Beach Boys recorded vocals for the track on October 3, 1966, but the tape from that session was lost. In 2003, the piece was retitled "Song for Children" and given new lyrics by Parks.

"He Gives Speeches"
"He Gives Speeches" was recorded on September 1, 1966, at the second-to-last session for "Good Vibrations". In July 1967, the composition was reworked as the first section of "She's Goin' Bald".

"Holidays"
"Holidays" (mislabeled on bootlegs as "Tones" or "Tune X") is an exotica instrumental that ends with a marimba melody later recycled for the 1967 version of "Wind Chimes". In 2003, the piece was given new lyrics and retitled "On a Holiday".

"I Wanna Be Around"
"I Wanna Be Around" is a rendition of the Sadie Vimmerstedt and Johnny Mercer pop standard. It was recorded the day after the "Fire" session, along with a piece titled "Friday Night", which was intended to segue from "I Wanna Be Around". Halfway through the session, Wilson conceived the idea to overdub the sounds of construction noises onto the track. He then handed out various tools to his musicians for them to create the sounds of sawing, wood cutting, hammering, and drilling. In 1968, these noises (also known as "Workshop", "Woodshop", and "The Woodshop Song") were used on the fade-out of the album version of "Do It Again". In 2005, Wilson wrote that the purpose of recording "I Wanna Be Around" was "to show how I could be funny and serious at the same time". Priore claimed that Wilson later told collaborator Andy Paley that "I Wanna Be Around" and "Workshop" were meant to function as a "rebuilding after the fire".

"You're Welcome"
"You're Welcome" is a vocal chant with heavy reverb that was later issued as the B-side of the 1967 "Heroes and Villains" single.

"Love to Say Dada"
"Love to Say Dada" (or "All Day") is a piece that later evolved into "Cool, Cool Water". In 2003, "Love to Say Dada" was given new lyrics by Parks and retitled "In Blue Hawaii".

Audio vérité and other recordings

Wilson held sessions that were dedicated to capturing "humorous" situations. According to Carlin, Wilson devoted "hours [to] recording himself and friends while they chanted, played games, had pretend arguments, or just shot the breeze. It was just like the old days with his Wollensak recorder, except much, much weirder." The surviving tapes include:

 Lifeboat reel (recorded October 18, 1966)  24-minutes long and features Wilson, Parks, Anderle, Vosse, Wilson's sister-in-law Diane Rovell, a woman named Dawn, and Siegel. Throughout the tape, Siegel encourages others to play the party game Lifeboat, where players act as shipwreck survivors who have to decide who among them will be tossed overboard in order to save the others. It later turns into barbed exchanges between the participants. At one point, someone asks Wilson, "What are we doing here?" As the mood worsens, Wilson is heard saying, "I feel so depressed. Really, seriously. I keep sinking. I'm too down to smile."
 Second party reel (recorded November 4, 1966)  Features Wilson, Parks, Hutton, Vosse, and a man named Bob. The group pretend to order treats from a psychedelic ice cream van that plays a music box version of "Good Vibrations" (played by Wilson at a piano). Wilson then leads a comedy routine about falling into a piano, and then into a microphone. The group also plays a rhythm on bongos while chanting "Where's my beets and carrots" and "I've got a big bag of vegetables". Parks later said, "I sensed all that was destructive, so I withdrew from those related social encounters."
 "Vegetables Arguments" (recorded November 16, 1966)  Features mock disagreements between Vosse and session drummer Hal Blaine, who plays a man that is irate at Vosse for trespassing into his garden. It later turns into a serious conversation between Blaine, Vosse, and Wilson about the planetary alignments. Wilson completes the session by having his own mock disagreement with Blaine. Badman writes, "At one point, it is believed that these recordings will somehow figure into the 'Vegetables' track itself."

In early 1967, Brian's brothers Carl and Dennis went into the studio to record pieces that they had written individually. Dennis' "I Don't Know" was recorded on January 12, and Carl's "Tune X" (later "Tones") followed on March 3 and 31. Badman speculated the recordings may have been "part of a conscious effort to make [Smile] more of a group effort than effective a Brian solo project, or may simply be for Carl and Dennis to test their production mettle."

Brian also recorded novelty songs with photographer Jasper Daily: "Teeter Totter Love", "Crack the Whip", and "When I Get Mad I Just Play My Drums". Love characterized "Teeter Totter Love" as "Simple but poignant." The AFM contracts for these tracks list "Brother Records" under "Employer's Name". Gaines wrote that these recordings were to have fulfilled Wilson's separate "humor album" concept. The collection was offered to A&M Records but rejected. Vosse said that when Wilson pitched "Crack the Whip" to Chuck Kaye, the head of A&M, "You could see the panic on [Kaye's] face when he heard how awful it was. This look of, 'What the fuck do I do?'"

Artwork and packaging

Capitol gave Smile the catalog number DT2580. At least two versions of the album jacket were designed, with minor differences. It was to have included cover artwork designed by graphic artist Frank Holmes, a friend of Parks, as well as a booklet containing several pen-and-ink drawings, also by Holmes. He met with Wilson and Parks circa June 1966 and was given lyric sheets of their songs, for which he based his drawings on. By Holmes' recollection, his contributions were finished by October. The pieces were titled:

 "My Vega-tables" / "The Elements" ("Vega-Tables")
 "Do You Like Worms"
 "Two-step to lamps light" / "Surf's Up"
 "Diamond necklace play the pawn" ("Surf's Up")
 "Lost and found you still remain there" ("Cabinessence")
 "The rain of bullets eventually brought her down" ("Heroes and Villains")
 "Uncover the cornfield" / "Home on the Range" ("Cabinessence")

Holmes based the cover on an abandoned jewelry store near his home in Pasadena. He recalled, "I thought that was a good image because of the way, any time you go into a store, you're entering something[...] This was something that would be pulling you into the world of Smile–the Smile Shoppe–and it had these little smiles all around." Depicted inside the shop is "a husband and wife—a kind of early-Americana, old-style, 19th-century kind of image." Wilson approved the cover and took it to Capitol. Parks later said that the illustrations heavily informed the making of Smile and considered them to be the album's "third equation". He felt that he and Wilson would not have continued the project the way they did without thinking of it in cartoon terms.

According to Vosse, the smile shop derived from Wilson's humor concept. He said that "everybody who knew anything about graphics, and about art, thought that the cover was not terribly well done[...] but Brian knew better; he was right. It was exactly what he wanted, precisely what he wanted." Parks recalled: "Frank was supposed to do something 'light-hearted', but there were no specific instructions and he came up with the perfect video vessel for realizing what we were doing, something I thought was an integral part of the situation. I think that still stands; I think of Smile in visual terms.

In September, Capitol began production on a lavish gatefold cover with a 12-page booklet containing featuring color photographs of the group (ultimately selected from a November 7 photoshoot in Boston conducted by Guy Webster as well as Holmes' illustrations). In early 1967, they added the repeated written instances of "Good Vibrations" on the album cover, which were not featured on Holmes' original design. The back cover featured a monochrome photograph depiction of the group, without Brian, framed by astrological symbols. Capitol produced 466,000 copies of the record sleeve and 419,200 copies of the accompanying booklet. They were stored in a warehouse in Pennsylvania until the 1990s.

Original recording sessions and collapse

Smile was shelved due to corporate pressures, technical problems, internal power struggles, legal stalling, and Wilson's deteriorating mental health. After investing several months into the project, he concluded that Smile was too esoteric for the public and decided to record simpler music instead. Carl stated that Brian felt he could not complete the album and was intensely afraid of an unfavorable public response. In Brian's own words, he and his band felt "we were too selfishly artistic and weren't thinking about the public enough."

Criticism from Wilson's bandmates (1966–1967)
Writers frequently theorize that the album was cancelled because Wilson's bandmates were unable to appreciate the music. However, Stebbins says that the conclusions those writers draw from this perspective are "overly simplistic and mostly wrong" with not enough consideration for Wilson's psychological decline. Derek Taylor remembered that although Brian exhibited "scary" mood swings, his bandmates were generally supportive of him. Taylor also remembered Wilson being terribly insecure and highly sensitive to criticism, having "never [left me] in peace" whenever he would be asked by Wilson to offer music opinions.

Carl, Dennis, and Jardine contributed instrumentally to some of the tracking sessions, and Carl participated in the sessions more than anyone else in the band with the exception of Brian, although Stebbins notes, "Even Carl was unhappy with the project". Having attended some of the sessions circa January 1967, journalist Tracy Thomas reported in the NME that Brian's "dedication to perfection does not always endear him to his fellow Beach Boys, nor their wives, nor their next door neighbours, with whom they were to have dinner[...] But when the finished product is 'Good Vibrations' or Pet Sounds or Smile they hold back their complaints." Tony Asher said that Brian's bandmates never "really challenged Brian" on his direction for the group because they had felt "they weren't talented enough" to make such judgments.

It is often suggested that Mike Love, in particular, was responsible for the project's collapse. Love dismissed such claims as hyperbole and said that his vocal opposition to Wilson's drug suppliers was what spurred the accusation that he, as well as other members of the band and Wilson's family, sabotaged the project. Wilson's statements on the matter have been inconsistent; he has both supported and denied whether his confidence in the project had been undermined by Love. Parks' later accounts suggest that he was dismissed from the project at Love's behest. In his words, he disassociated himself from the Beach Boys because Love and "the least known members" had decided "that I had written some words that were indecipherable and unnecessary." When he was interviewed for the 1976 television special The Beach Boys: It's OK!, he added, "I said [to Mike], 'I don't know what these lyrics are about. They aren't important, throw them away.' And so they did."

In journalist Clinton Heylin's estimation, other reports suggest that it is more likely that Wilson himself became dissatisfied with Parks' lyrics, although "Love certainly happily fed" Wilson's change of opinion. Commenting on the accusation that he contributed to the project's collapse, Love said, "Maybe I'm cast in that light, which is unfortunate but maybe deserving.[...] You do a lot of pot, LSD, cocaine, you name it, paranoia runs rampant, so, yes, Brian could have become extra-, ultrasensitive[...] But can I be responsible? Should Mike Love take a beating for Brian's paranoid schizophrenia? "

Drug use, Wilson's mental state and perfectionism (1966–1967)

One of the major issues that led to project's collapse was Wilson's uncompromising perfectionism, which may have been exacerbated by his drug use at the time. In one Smile session tape, a horn player can be heard sarcastically remarking of the producer's repeated calls for retakes, "Perfect – just one more". At the end of another session, which had lasted until dawn, an engineer asked Wilson's wife if she thought he would be satisfied with a certain take, to which she responded, "No, when he gets home he won't be satisfied. He's never satisfied."

Wilson was later declared to have bipolar and schizoaffective disorders, although most of the members in his coterie did not feel that he showed signs of mental illness during the early Smile sessions. In Vosse's recollection, Wilson was no more eccentric than "a lot of people in showbiz" and "all those things that people looked back upon later as quite alarming" had not originally appeared to be of significant concern. Anderle supported the notion: "Brian wasn't the only [strange] one. We were all strange, doing strange things." Taylor remembered struggling with Wilson's "temporary whims".

To prepare for the album's writing and recording, Wilson had purchased about two thousand dollars' worth of marijuana and hashish (equivalent to $ in ). He erected a $30,000 ($) hotboxing tent in what was formerly his dining room, located a sandbox under the grand piano in his den, and, after developing a fixation with health and fitness, replaced his living room furniture with gym mats. In reference to the tent, Vosse said, "we were all excited about it, [and] anybody who thinks this was like Brian being wacko and everybody [else disapproving] is wrong." David Oppenheim, who briefly visited Wilson's home in late 1966, later described the scene as "a strange, insulated household, insulated from the world by money[...] A playpen of irresponsible people." The sandbox remained in Wilson's home until April 1967.

Some of his bandmates also indulged in recreational drug use. Carl recalled: "To get that album out, someone would have needed willingness and perseverance to corral all of us. Everybody was so loaded on pot and hash all of the time that it's no wonder the project didn't get done." Dennis echoed that the group became "very paranoid about the possibility of losing our public.[...] Drugs played a great role in our evolution but as a result we were frightened that people would no longer understand us, musically." Brian told an interviewer in 1976: "We were too fucking high, you know, to complete the stuff. We were stoned! You know, stoned on hash 'n' shit!"

Brian's use of LSD was negligible compared to his use of Desbutal. Parks said that he never witnessed Wilson using psychedelics, and, in a 2004 interview, stated that "Brian was strongly against acid at that time." He said that he had not been interested in using psychedelics himself, nor "anything that would incapacitate" Wilson. Anderle also said he never saw Wilson taking psychedelics. Vosse said that Wilson "may have taken LSD once" at the time. Siegel attributed Wilson's paranoid delusions, odd behavior, and loss of artistic confidence to his abuse of Desbutal:

Vosse said that, despite the large amount of marijuana that was available, Wilson "wasn't stoned all the time[...] really, Brian had a job to do, and he was a hard workin' guy." He referred to Brian's drug use as "the biggest red herring in [his] story I've heard so far", and rebuked the accusation that Brian was "some kind of nut". Hutton disputed that the drugs "got in the way at all" and believed that Brian's use of certain substances had helped him "work longer hours." Parks said: "Don't let the marijuana confuse the issue here. If you look at the amount of work that was done in the amount of time it took to almost finish it, it's amazing. A very athletic situation, very focused."

Early sessions and promotion (May–December 1966)

On May 11, 1966, Wilson recorded an instrumental take of "Heroes and Villains" at Gold Star Studios. The session was conducted as an experiment and was not a full-fledged recording. On August 3, Wilson returned to the studio for the tracking of "Wind Chimes", marking the unofficial start of the album's sessions. From then, over 80 sessions were conducted for the album, spread out over the next ten months. "Good Vibrations" was completed on September 21. By then, Dumb Angel had been renamed to Smile.

Smile was one of the most-discussed albums in the rock press and was first projected for a December 1966 release date. Derek Taylor continued to write articles in the music press, sometimes anonymously, in an effort to further speculation about the album. "Good Vibrations" was released as a single and became the group's third US number-one hit, reaching the top of the Billboard Hot 100 in December, as well as their first number one in Britain. Wilson told Melody Maker that Smile would "be as much an improvement over [Pet] Sounds as that was over Summer Days". Dennis told Hit Parader: "In my opinion, it makes Pet Sounds stink. That's how good it is." At some point, Wilson, alongside Michael Vosse, made an appearance on The Lloyd Thaxton Show, where he spoke about the benefits of eating vegetables.

In December, Capitol ran ads for the album In Billboard that read: "Good Vibrations. Number One in England. Coming soon with the 'Good Vibrations' sound. Smile. The Beach Boys." This was followed  with a color ad in TeenSet that exclaimed "Look! Listen! Vibrate! SMILE!" The ad promised the inclusion of "Good Vibrations" as well as "other new and fantastic Beach Boys songs[...] and[...] an exciting full-color sketch-book look inside the world of Brian Wilson!" Cardboard displays of the album's cover artwork were displayed in record stores, and Capitol circulated a promotional ad for employees at its label, which used "Good Vibrations" as the backdrop for a voice-over saying: "With a happy album cover, the really happy sounds inside, and a happy in-store display piece, you can't miss! We're sure to sell a million units[...] in January!"

In the UK, one headline proclaimed that the Beach Boys' British distributor EMI Records were giving the band the "biggest campaign since the Beatles". On December 10, NME published a reader's poll that placed Wilson as the fourth-ranked "World Music Personality"—about 1,000 votes ahead of Bob Dylan and 500 behind John Lennon. In addition, the Beach Boys were voted the top band in the world, ahead of the Beatles, the Walker Brothers, the Rolling Stones, and the Four Tops. On December 17, KRLA Beat published a nonsense article by Wilson, titled "Vibrations – Brian Wilson Style", that contained many private jokes and references.

A Los Angeles Times West Magazine piece by Tom Nolan noted Wilson as "the seeming leader of a potentially-revolutionary movement in pop music". Biographer David Leaf wrote that although the success of "Good Vibrations" "bought Brian some time [and] shut up everybody who said that Brian's new ways wouldn't sell[...] his inability to quickly follow up [the single was what] became a snowballing problem." Sanchez writes that Wilson was "poised to take his place next to the Beatles and Bob Dylan on the board of pop music luminaries", but as time passed, the hype for Smile went from "expectation" to "doubt" and "bemusement".

First signs of issues and resistance (November–December 1966)

Wilson started having increasing doubts about the project during the latter months of 1966. From October 25 to November 14, Wilson's bandmates embarked on a tour of Europe (which included the group's first dates in the UK), followed by their fourth annual US Thanksgiving tour from November 16 to 24. Vosse later wrote that Smile "was a totally conceived entity" when the group was away on their British tour, but upon their return, the project "started going nuts". In Gaines' description, Wilson's bandmates "knew nothing of Brian's strange behavior" and were "infuriated" when they returned to California; to them, Anderle now appeared as the leader of "a whole group of strangers [that] had infiltrated and taken over the Beach Boys", and which were encouraging Wilson's eccentricities. Anderle commented, "I stand guilty on those counts[...] I was an interloper and I was definitely fueling his creativity. No holds barred. No rules."

Wilson's friends, family, and colleagues often date the project's unraveling to around the time he recorded "Fire" on November 28. Parks did not attend the session and later said that he had avoided it "like the plague" due to what he had perceived as "regressive behavior" from Wilson. Within a few days of the "Fire" session, a building across the street from the studio burned down. Wilson was frightened that the music may have caused the fire and decided to discard the track. He later said that his use of marijuana and hashish led him to believe that he was creating witchcraft music.

Tensions during the recording sessions emerged around this time, marking a contrast from the joyous atmosphere that began the project. Anderle remembered that the debacle with "The Elements" coincided with what he felt was one of the greatest factors in the project's demise: resistance Wilson began to encounter in the studio – namely with "engineers", "getting studio time", and "giv[ing] parts to one of the fellas or to a group of the fellas". He said that Wilson "would go through a tremendous paranoia before he would get into the studio, knowing he was going to have to face an argument."

"Don't fuck with the formula"

"Don't fuck with the formula" is a quote that is often attributed to Love, although Love denied saying those specific words and later argued that the Beach Boys "have no formula." The remark originates from a 1971 Rolling Stone magazine article, "The Beach Boys: A California Saga", written by Nolan. Unusual for rock journalism of the era, Nolan's article devoted minimal attention to the group's music, and instead focused on the band's internal dynamics and history, especially the events surrounding the Smile sessions. The relevant text is as follows:

In a prior interview from 1968, Anderle said that Wilson's bandmates were first concerned about losing "what the Beach Boys are" by going too "far out" beyond a "simple dumb thing", and "wanted to stay pretty much within the form of what the Beach Boys had created — really hard[...] whatever that is, California rock or whatever." By Vosse's account, while tensions had developed during the group vocal sessions, "older members of the Wilson family did everything possible to destroy the relationship between Brian and Van Dyke, Brian and David Anderle, and Brian and me.[...] out of suspicion[...] that the Beach Boys would dissolve.[...] and they didn't like our appearances."

Love addressed these accusations in a 1993 interview by stating that he had been deeply concerned about Wilson's treatment of "himself", "others", and "the reputation of the band", as well as the potential destruction of "our livelihoods". In a 2015 interview, he indicated that he did not have an issue with "crazy stupid sounds", nor with accommodating Wilson's odd requests, but still desired "to make a commercially successful pop record, so I might have complained about some of the lyrics on Smile".  According to Carl, "I know there's been a lot written, and maybe said about Michael not liking the Smile music. I think his main problem was [that] the lyrics were not relatable. They were so artistic, and to him, they were really airy-fairy and too abstract. Personally, I loved it."

Over the ensuing decades, "don't fuck with the formula" has been repeated in myriad books, articles, websites, and blogs. In Leaf's 1978 biography The Beach Boys and the California Myth, Anderle is quoted saying that the line had been "taken slightly out of context", and clarified that Love had actually agreed with Anderle on "a business level.[...] Artistically, it was another matter." In a 1998 deposition related to the memoir Wouldn't It Be Nice: My Own Story, Wilson testified that Love had never spoken the line to him.

Capitol lawsuit and Parks' departure (December 1966 – March 1967)

In Parks' recollection, "the whole house of cards began tumbling down" when he was invited to the studio by Wilson to settle a dispute from Love over the "Cabinessence" lyric "over and over the crow cries uncover the cornfield". Love did not understand the lyrics and thought that the song contained possible references to drug culture, something that he did not wish to be associated with, and took to characterizing Parks' contributions as "acid alliteration". Although Parks did not offer him an explanation for the lyrics, Love sang the line despite his reservations. Vosse believed that "as schisms developed within the Beach Boys", Parks had become the "most convenient" scapegoat once the camp noticed that the songwriters "would fight every once in awhile [and] have arguments."

On December 15, Wilson informed Capitol A&R director Karl Engemann that the album and its lead single "Heroes and Villains" would probably be delivered "some time prior to January 15". In response, Capitol delayed the release date of Smile and "Heroes and Villains" to March 1967. Wilson had also begun to suspect that Capitol was withholding payments from the band and instructed Grillo to conduct an audit of the label's financial records. Discrepancies were soon found. Possibly due to Capitol's insistence on a ready single, Wilson returned to work on "Heroes and Villains" on December 19, 1966, after which he halted work on the album's other tracks until April 1967.

In January, Brian missed his deadline and began working less on the album, Carl received a draft notice from the US Army, "Good Vibrations" began falling off the top 20 chart positions after spending seven weeks in the top 10, and Parks was offered a solo artist deal from Warner Bros. Vosse said that Parks eventually signed the contract, "And the day he signed he put his head back into his own music again. And was less and less available to Brian. And Brian was less and less sure of what he was doing with the album."

On February 28, the band launched a lawsuit against Capitol that sought neglected royalty payments in the amount of $250,000 (equivalent to $ in ). Within the lawsuit, there was also an attempt to terminate their record contract prior to its November 1969 expiry. Following the suit, Wilson announced that the album's lead single would be "Vega-Tables", a song that he had yet to start recording. The Smile tapes were also temporarily housed at Sound Recorders, a studio belonging to engineer Armin Steiner. Anderle met with many record companies but failed to secure a distributor for Brother Records.

After February, by Anderle's account, tensions between Parks and Wilson flared as the songwriters "started clashing" because Wilson thought Parks' "lyric was too sophisticated, and in some areas Brian's music was not sophisticated enough [for Van Dyke]." Recalling the then-projected single release of "Vega-Tables", Parks said, "I am sure I would not have wanted 'Vega-Tables' to be given too much emphasis. For Smile, that celebrated collaboration, to be dependent on a commercial release of 'Vega-Tables' as a single, was to me tremendously ill-advised, wherever it came from." Jules Siegel said that Parks was "tired of being constantly dominated by Brian." Vosse wrote, "Van Dyke would get really mad because he hated working in a subservient position where there was someone that could say no; and Brian always maintained that. And every once in a while, he would say no just to let Van Dyke know he could say no: and that's what really made Van Dyke mad." Parks stated that he did not wish to keep involving himself with what he felt were family feuds unrelated to him and thought that Smile could have been finished without his continued participation.

On March 2, after a session for "Heroes and Villains", Wilson and Parks ran into disagreements, possibly over lyrics, and temporarily dissolved their partnership. The event is sometimes considered the symbolic end of the Smile era. Heylin states that the studio logs appear to indicate March 2 as the date that Smile was "abandoned". In March, Wilson cancelled a session – because he decided that the "vibrations" were too hostile – at a cost of $3,000 (equivalent to $ in ). Two other dates were also cancelled. On March 18, KMEM in San Bernardino conducted a radio survey that reported that Wilson was busy preparing "Heroes and Villains" and Smile, "and he's informed the Capitol bosses that he doesn't intend to 'hold back' on these projects." On March 30, KFXM reported that the continued litigation had held up the release of the new single.

Wilson's move to Bel-Air and disintegrated circle (Late 1966 – 1967)

Wilson's paranoid delusions intensified throughout the winter while his progressively erratic behavior started to alarm his associates. One of the well-known stories involve a portrait of Wilson that Anderle had been painting in secret for several months. When he showed the painting to Wilson, Wilson believed that the portrait had literally captured his soul. Anderle later said that he felt his relationship with Wilson was never the same afterward. On another occasion, after attending a theatrical screening for the film Seconds, Wilson was convinced that it had coded messages about his life planted by Phil Spector and director John Frankenheimer. According to Gaines, Wilson suggested to his colleagues that Spector and Frankenheimer were working together as part of a Jewish conspiracy to "destroy Brian Wilson[...] Anderle, himself a Jew, was so insulted he couldn't speak.[...] It took him several days to forgive Brian." Taylor said that Wilson later assigned "people [to follow] Spector. Then Murry was having Brian tailed and so Brian got someone to tail Murry and it just went on and on. All of it complete insanity."

In Wilson's own words, he had become "fucked up" and "jealous" of Spector and the Beatles, and he said that when he started Smile, he had been "trying to beat" the Beatles. Taylor commented that Wilson was preoccupied with "a mad possessive battle" against the Rolling Stones and "particularly" the Beatles, and that he "didn't want me to like any other artist but himself." Throughout early 1967, the music industry and pop fans were aware that the Beatles were working on a significant new work as their follow-up to Revolver, with the band having been ensconced in their London studios since the previous November. According to historian Darren Reid: "In Wilson's mind, the first album to market [in 1967] would be the one to claim victory, it would be the record which would set the standard against which all other albums released after that time would have to be judged."

A popular rumor is that Wilson was deeply affected by his first exposure to the Beatles' February 1967 single "Strawberry Fields Forever". He heard the song while driving with Michael Vosse under the influence of Seconal (a sedating drug). Vosse recalled that as Wilson pulled over to listen, "He just shook his head and said, 'They did it already—what I wanted to do with Smile. Maybe it's too late.' I started laughing my head off, and he started laughing his head off." He tempered his statement by saying that he "never gave much import" to Wilson's remark. Responding to a fan's question on his website in 2014, Wilson denied that hearing the song had "weakened" him.

In mid-1967, Wilson and his wife put their Beverly Hills home up for sale and took residence at a newly-purchased mansion in Bel Air. He also set to work on constructing a personal home studio. While staying with Taylor in Los Angeles, Paul McCartney visited a "Vega-Tables" session, after which he previewed an upcoming Beatles song for Wilson: "She's Leaving Home". Around this time, Wilson became aware of rumors alleging that  Taylor had possibly played some of the Smile tapes for the Beatles. His attitude changed "completely", according to Parks, as Wilson felt "raped" and began "question[ing] the loyalties of the people who were working for him".

Most of the coterie, including Parks and Siegel, disassociated themselves or were exiled from Wilson's social group by April. Siegel was told by Vosse that he was banished from Wilson's social circle because his girlfriend was suspected by Wilson to have been disrupting his work through ESP. According to Siegel, "Wilson didn't trust [anyone] anymore, [but] with some of them he had good reason." Vosse was dismissed in March, as Wilson's bandmates resented the fact that they had been paying the salary of an aide who worked solely for Wilson.

Semi-hiatus (April–May 1967)

Wilson depended on Parks whenever issues came up in the studio, and when Parks left, the end result was that Wilson lost track of how the album's fragmented music should be assembled. Parks briefly returned to the project starting on March 31; his last recorded appearance on the album's sessions was for a "Vega-Tables" date on April 14, after which Wilson took a four-week break from the studio. Anderle said that, at the time, he felt that "the central thing [that destroyed Smile] was Van Dyke's severing of the relationship." He left of his own accord weeks later; the last time Wilson was visited by Anderle to discuss business matters, Wilson refused to leave his bedroom. Wilson had discussed breaking up the Beach Boys "on many occasions," according to Anderle, "But it was easier, I think to get rid of the outsiders like myself than it was to break up the brothers. You can't break up brothers."

On April 25, CBS premiered Inside Pop: The Rock Revolution, a documentary by David Oppenheim. According to Leaf, the documentary was originally supposed to be focused on Wilson, but it was later decided to expand the scope of the program due to the Beach Boys' waning popularity in early 1967. Wilson's segment was limited to footage of him singing "Surf's Up" at his piano without any interview footage or references to Smile. According to Kent, when Wilson viewed the finished documentary, he was disturbed by the praises he was afforded, thereby accelerating the album's collapse.

Desperate for a new product from the group, on April 28, the group's British distributor EMI released "Then I Kissed Her" as a single without the band's approval. On April 29, Taylor announced in Disc & Music Echo that "All the 12 songs for the new Beach Boys album are completed and[...] there are plans to release the album on a rush-schedule any moment." That same day, a Taylor-penned press release, published in Record Mirror and NME, revealed that "Heroes and Villains" was delayed due to "technical difficulties" and that the forthcoming lead single would be "Vegetables" backed with "Wonderful". A session scheduled for May 1 was cancelled.

Williams reported in the May issue of Crawdaddy! that the next Beach Boys LP would include "Heroes and Villains" ("weighing in at over four minutes"), "The Elements" ("a composition in four movements"), "The Child Is the Father of the Man" , "and something about going in the yard to eat worms." He wrote, "Lyrics are mostly by Van Dyke Parks, and it is possible that the LP will be finished one of these days. Smile." On May 6, a week after stating that Smile was to be released "any moment", Taylor announced in Disc & Music Echo that the album had been "scrapped" by Wilson, however, it is likely that the report was spurious and that Wilson was unaware of Taylor's proclamation.

On May 11, Wilson returned to the studio to work on "Heroes and Villains". On May 14, his bandmates conducted a press conference at the Amsterdam Hilton with the Dutch music press. Hitweek later reported that communications between Wilson and his bandmates had broken down to the point that his bandmates thought Smile had been scheduled for release by mid-May. The next day, Wilson cancelled a session for "Love to Say Dada", again due to "bad vibes". Badman states that the final session for the album was held for "Love to Say Dada" on May 18. A follow-up that was scheduled for the next day was cancelled.

Smiley Smile (June–July 1967) 
It is sometimes suggested that Wilson cancelled Smile because of the widespread recognition afforded to the Beatles' Sgt. Pepper's Lonely Hearts Club Band (released in the U.S. on June 2). Leaf writes that the success of the Beatles' album was "probably only another contributing factor", reasoning that "if Brian had decided to scrap Smile only because of Pepper, then he probably would not have released ['Heroes and Villains' weeks later]." From June 3 to 7, the band resumed sessions at professional studios before retreating to the home studio. In a June issue of Hit Parader, Dennis reported that the group were still recording Smile and that the album was "50% done".

Wilson reflected that he had run out of ideas "in a conventional sense" during this period and had been "about ready to die".  He said: "Time can be spent in the studio to the point where you get so next to it, you don't know where you are with it, you decide to just chuck it for a while." Wilson declared to his bandmates that most of the material recorded for Smile was now off-limits and later said that his decision to keep "Surf's Up" unreleased was one that "nearly broke up" the band.

From June to July, the Beach Boys reconvened at Wilson's home to record the bulk of Smiley Smile at his improvised studio. The album is a significantly less ambitious affair than Smile, being stylistically similar to Beach Boys' Party!, and includes simplified remakes of select Smile material. Only two tracks used modules that had originated from the Smile sessions (two for "Heroes and Villains" and two for "Vegetables"). Parks was not involved with the album's making.

Smiley Smile is sometimes considered the fulfillment of Wilson's "humor" concept album. This belief was shared by Anderle, who surmised, "I think that what Brian tried to do with Smiley Smile is he tried to salvage as much of Smile as he could and at the same time immediately go into his humor album." Carl compared it to "a bunt instead of a grand slam". The cover artwork featured a new illustration of Frank Holmes' smile shop, this time located in the middle of an overgrown jungle.

On July 18, Capitol announced that they had reached a settlement with the band, and Brian announced the launch of Brother Records, whose product was to be distributed by Capitol. Capitol A&R director Karl Engemann began circulating a memo, dated July 25, in which Smiley Smile was referred to as a "cartoon" stopgap for Smile. The memo also discussed conversations between him and Wilson pertaining to the release of a 10-track Smile album that would not have included "Heroes and Villains" or "Vegetables". This never came to fruition and, instead, the group embarked on a tour of Hawaii in August. On September 18, Smiley Smile, the first album by the band in which the production was credited to "the Beach Boys", was released to an underwhelming critical and commercial response.

Aftermath

Wilson's struggles and Song Cycle

Throughout 1967, Wilson's image reduced to that of an "eccentric" figure as a multitude of revolutionary rock albums were released to an anxious and maturing youth market. He gradually ceded production and songwriting duties to the rest of the group and self-medicated with the excessive consumption of food, alcohol, and drugs. For many years after its shelving, Wilson was traumatized by Smile and regarded the album as representing all of his failures in life. He stated that he considered the recordings "contrived with no soul" and "corny drug influenced music", as well as imitations of the work of Phil Spector without "getting anywhere near him". In a 1993 interview, Bruce Johnston remembered of the Smile sessions,

After breaking away from the project, Parks signed a solo contract with Warner Bros, where he formed part of a creative circle that came to include producer Lenny Waronker and songwriter Randy Newman. In late 1967, the company released Parks' debut solo album, Song Cycle, a record that often was, and continues to be, compared to Smile. Although Song Cycle sold poorly, Parks continued working at Warner as an arranger. Biographer Kevin Courrier wrote that the "failed aspiration of Smile served as a guiding spirit" for Song Cycle as well as the Parks- and Waronker-produced debut album by Newman, Randy Newman Creates Something New Under the Sun (1968). Music historian Timothy White writes that "the lives and business interests" of Wilson, Parks, Waronker, and Warner Bros. would become "forever intertwined".

Over the years, Wilson gradually became more comfortable discussing the work, calling it "too advanced" to have been released in 1967, while Parks attempted to distance himself from the album's legend. In 1998, he referred to Smile as "just a few months of work I did as a contract employee many, many years ago. Life goes on.[...] I think it means a lot more to other people than it does for me." Writing in his 2006 biography on Wilson, Carlin said that Parks "didn't necessarily appreciate how his [career] still resided in the shadow of something that didn't quite get finished in 1967." He added that Parks also resented that he was not properly credited for some songs that were published on later Beach Boys albums. "And if Van Dyke felt guilty about abandoning his Smile partner just as the going was getting tough, he was also a hardworking professional who believed that Brian's surrender, followed by decades of near-withdrawal, mounted to another kind of betrayal."

Further recording and abandoned Reprise release
Some of the Smile material continued to trickle out in subsequent Beach Boys releases, often as filler songs to offset Wilson's unwillingness to contribute. The first two instances of recycled Smile songs appeared on the albums directly following Smiley Smile: "Mama Says" from Wild Honey (1967) and "Little Bird" from Friends (1968). "Mama Says" was based on a section from "Vega-Tables" and the bridge of "Little Bird" was based on the refrain of "Child Is Father of the Man". Neither of the tracks were recordings from the Smile sessions; they were each recorded for their respective albums.

In 1969, "Cabin Essence" (retitled "Cabinessence") and "Prayer" (retitled "Our Prayer") appeared on the band's album 20/20, with additional vocals that were recorded by Carl, Dennis, and Johnston in November 1968. "Workshop" was also integrated into the 20/20 version of "Do It Again". According to Carlin, Brian was opposed to the inclusion of "Prayer" and "Cabin Essence", and refused to participate in the overdub sessions. After 20/20, the Beach Boys signed to Reprise Records, a deal that was brokered by Parks, by then a multimedia executive at Warner. The band's record contract held a clause which guaranteed a $50,000 advancement to the group provided that they deliver a completed Smile album by 1973. Brian was not consulted on this stipulation.  Their first Reprise album, Sunflower, was released in 1970. At Waronker's insistence, the record included "Cool, Cool Water", a song that had evolved from "Love to Say Dada".

For the band's second Reprise album, tentatively titled Landlocked, Wilson agreed to the inclusion of "Surf's Up". From mid-June to early July 1971, Carl and band manager Jack Rieley retrieved the Smile multi-tracks from Capitol's vaults, primarily to locate the "Surf's Up" masters, and attempted to repair and splice the tapes. Brian joined them on at least two occasions. Afterward, the band set to work on recording the song at Brian's home studio. Brian initially refused to participate in these sessions, but after a few days, he added a part to the song's "Child Is Father of the Man" coda. Landlocked was then rechristened Surf's Up and released in August. Most listeners at the time were unaware that the song derived from a lost Beach Boys album.

On February 28, 1972, Carl announced the imminent release of Smile at a London press conference. Asked if he had been working on the album, he replied that he had, during the previous June, and that the group had created safety copies of all the tapes. He claimed that these tapes were now fully assembled and new vocals had been overdubbed where necessary. Melody Maker printed a list of songs that were to be included on Carl's proposed version of Smile, some of which "seem[ed] to come under the overall subtitle of 'Heroes and Villains'". They were: "Child Is Father of the Man", "Surf's Up", "Sunshine", "Cabinessence" (incorporating "Iron Horse" ), "Mrs. O'Leary's Cow", "I Love to Say Dada" (incorporating "Cool, Cool Water"), and the original versions of "Vega-Tables", "Wind Chimes", and "Wonderful".

Asked about the forthcoming release at a later date, Carl responded: "We've all had intentions of finishing the album, but something persists that keeps that from happening, and I don't know what that is." In April 1973, the band's assistant manager Steve Love wrote a memo to remind the group that, "pursuant to the terms of contract between Warner Brothers and Brother Records, Inc., The Beach Boys' Smile album is supposed to be delivered to Warner Brothers no later than May 1st or $50,000 is to be deducted from any advance to the group after May 1st." No album was delivered, and as threatened, $50,000 was held back from the group's next payment (equivalent to $ in ).

Other developments and release rumors

1970s
In 1973, Brian told a Melody Maker reporter that there was not enough material to compile a Smile album and that it would never be released. Also in 1973, Wilson and his group American Spring contributed additional vocal and instrumental parts to a remix of Dean Torrence's 1967 rendition of "Vegetables", credited to "Laughing Gravy", and released on the Jan and Dean compilation Gotta Take That One Last Ride. In a 1976 interview, Wilson stated that he felt an obligation to release Smile and offered that the album would come out "probably in a couple years."

In his 1978 biography of the band, David Leaf wrote that Smile "can never be completed as Brian intended, so a compromise solution might be to release the surviving tapes and outtakes in a series of records called The Smile Sessions [like] Elvis' Sun Sessions[...]" The book included quotes from Johnston, who believed that such a release would be a "bad idea" commercially and "would live up to your expectations [only] if you were Zubin Mehta analyzing a young composer's work." In a later interview that year, he told Leaf that the band's manager James William Guercio had insisted on opening L.A. (Light Album) with "Rock Plymouth Rock/Roll". Johnston said: "I wanted to make up a collage [of the Smile recordings], but I want Brian to be the one to put the collage together. I can tell he still feels funny about that stuff. You know, there a lot of Smile stuff intact …"

1980s
In 1980, Wilson discussed an intention to complete Smile and assemble the tracks in three movements. In 1981, Johnston declared plans to issue a brief six-minute compilation of the album's recording sessions without Wilson's knowledge. He said, "It's better to do it that way, because musically now, as opposed to '66 or '78, it would be more interesting to just give you a peek at it than to do the whole thing. There's been too much press on it. It's like talking about bringing out the '67 Rolls Royce and they finally show it in '81. You go, 'Oh, no.'" In April 1985, the video documentary The Beach Boys: An American Band featured some previously unreleased music, including an excerpt of "Fire".

In 1987, Waronker encouraged Wilson to compose a Smile-esque song for his debut solo album, Brian Wilson (1988). This resulted in the "Rio Grande" suite, written with co-producer Andy Paley. Wilson commented that Waronker "wanted me to get a little bit into that kind of Smile bag, and I did."

During the late 1980s, Mark Linett prepared mixes of some Smile tracks in anticipation for a then-forthcoming release. In 1988, Wilson confirmed that Smile was being compiled and mixed for an imminent release. In another report, he said that the forthcoming project "got sidetracked with business" and worried whether the album would sell due to it being mostly background tracks. He added that he considered asking his bandmates to overdub the remaining vocal tracks. According to journalist David Cavanaugh, "things went awry when a cassette compiled for Capitol executives leaked into the public domain, causing Brian to lose interest."

1990s
Capitol issued alternate versions of "Good Vibrations" and "Heroes and Villains" as bonus tracks on a 1990 CD reissue of Smiley Smile and Wild Honey. In 1993, over 40 minutes of original Smile recordings were included on the career-spanning box set Good Vibrations: Thirty Years of the Beach Boys. The set feature the first official release of a compiled Smile album, sequenced by David Leaf, Paley, and Linett. Heiser reviewed that there was "little attempt made to create a sense of flow" and the modules were instead "mostly presented 'as-is'".

In 1995, Wilson reteamed with Parks for the collaborative album Orange Crate Art, which provoked speculation regarding a future release of Smile. Wilson also performed "Wonderful", in its original Smile arrangement, for the documentary I Just Wasn't Made for These Times, and this rendition was included on the accompanying soundtrack album. In addition, Capitol announced a three-CD box set entitled The Smile Era to be released in the autumn. A Smile box set failed to materialize at this time partly due to the arduous task of compiling and sequencing.

Producer Don Was told The New York Times in August 1995: "We showed Brian an interactive CD-ROM of Todd Rundgren's [No World Order] and told him that this is how he should release Smile. He could load up an interactive CD with seven hours of stuff from those sessions and just tell the people who buy it, 'You finish it.' Brian's into it; now it's up to the record company." Following the recording of Stars and Stripes Vol. 1 (1996), the Beach Boys discussed finishing Smile at a band meeting. Carl rejected the idea, as he feared that it would cause Brian another nervous breakdown. The difficulties that caused the 18-month delay for the release of The Pet Sounds Sessions (1997) discouraged Capitol from issuing a similar box set for Smile.

Asked about Smile during the press run for his 1998 comeback album Imagination, Wilson responded, "I thought too much. Smile was just a bunch of weird stuff that didn't even amount to anything." In 2001, weeks after his first public performance of "Heroes and Villains" in decades, he told an interviewer: "I don't really ever want to put out the Smile stuff. It's just not appropriate music.[...] I know it's a legendary thing. The Smile trip is a legend."

Bootlegs, unofficial reconstructions, and fan efforts

Many of the original Smile recordings were only publicly available on bootlegs until 2011. These bootlegs often presented a hypothetical vision of the completed album, with compilers including liner notes that explained their choices of sequencing. One of the most relied-upon sources for the album's contents came from Wilson's list of song titles from December 1966.

Earliest bootlegs

Audio bootlegs purported as Smile began circulating among fans during the late 1970s and drew upon released material from Smiley Smile, 20/20, and Surf's Up. The compilers were only informed by the song titles from the December 1966 track list and were not always aware that the recordings on those albums were not the original Smile versions. According to Andrew Flory, "Little is known about the process through which [actual] Smile material leaked into bootleggers' hands." One rumor holds that the first tapes came from Dennis, who had created copies for friends, who then created copies for their friends. Although there were rumors of leaked tape transfers and acetate discs in the late 1970s, only a minimal amount of this material was available to bootleggers until the early 1980s.

In the 1970s and early 1980s, fan groups for the Beach Boys were organized by at least a dozen people, including Alice Lillie, Paula Perrin, Peter Reum, David Leaf, Marty Tabor, Don Cunningham, Domenic Priore, and Mike Grant. Most of the fan correspondence was through newsletters, which helped disseminate information and attract people who were interested in compiling details concerning the band's music. The proliferation of these groups was due in part to an advertisement for Beach Boys Freaks United, the band's official fan club, that was displayed on the back cover of the 1976 album 15 Big Ones. Priore later wrote that "It wasn't much of a publication, but it did include a 'Trading Post' [that] became an essential, pre-Internet contact source."

To assist with the writing of his 1978 authorized biography of the band, Byron Preiss was given a tape of Smile recordings, the contents of which were distributed to a small group of people over the next few years. In 1983, a 48-minute cassette tape began circulating and was soon pressed onto an LP bootleg that was referred to as the "Brother Records" Smile. It included a range of material that originated from Smile or was thought to be related to the project, as well as an unrelated 1959 recording, "Here Come de Honey Man" by Miles Davis, that was erroneously listed as "Holidays". The LP did not indicate an authorial origin on its sleeve but featured the organizational addresses of Cunningham's Add Some Music, Tabor's Celebrate, Beach Boys Freaks United, and the Australian publication California Music.

Proliferation

In 1985, a "Second Edition" of the Brother Records LP surfaced without the labelled addresses and with a significantly different presentation order. The set also included different mixes that suggested a spread of newly available Smile recordings. Their improved sound quality indicated that a Beach Boys insider had accessed the band's tape vaults and created cassette copies of the recordings. In 1988, one of the collaborators on Wilson's 1988 solo album was given 1st-generation copies of Smile recordings, which were then passed on to a DJ, who then made copies for friends. Following this, in the words of music historian Andrew Doe, "Bootlegs of Smile came out left, right and centre."

Since the mid-1980s, CDs had supplanted vinyl as the predominant medium for bootlegs, and dozens of different Smile CD releases were traded and sold commercially by mail order, independent record stores, and head shops. Many of the new buyers had crossed over from Beatles bootleg markets, and, responding to a suggestion in Leaf's 1993 Good Vibrations liner notes, a preponderance of listeners began constructing their own version of the album using the resources provided in the box set. One of the most popular Smile bootlegs from the late 1980s was a Japanese CD (emerging in November 1989) that opened with a 15-minute version of "Good Vibrations". Capitol released the material on the Good Vibrations box set in response to the 1992 appearance of a new three-disc vinyl bootleg that contained uncirculated versions of "Wonderful", "Love to Say Dada" and "Barnyard".

Two types of Smile bootlegs appeared in the 1990s: those in which the compilers attempted to assemble the album in a completed form, and others that simply presented the project as session recordings. The best-known releases were issued by the underground labels Vigotone and Sea of Tunes. They both released Smile sets that combined the two types of bootlegs and helped bring interest to the recordings among people outside of the Beach Boys fan community. Vigotone's 1993 version of the album was the heaviest-circulated Smile bootleg for that decade. In the late 1990s, Sea of Tunes released seven hours of Smile music spread out over eight CDs as part of their "Unsurpassed Masters" series.

By the end of the 1990s, Smile had become one of the most well-documented projects in the bootlegging community. Those involved with releasing the Sea of Tunes bootlegs were later apprehended by authorities, and it was reported that nearly 10,000 discs were seized. Vigotone planned to follow their 1998 bootleg, Heroes and Vibrations, with a multi-disc Smile box set before they were similarly raided and closed down by law enforcement in 2001.

Look! Listen! Vibrate! Smile!
In the late 1980s, Domenic Priore collaborated with musicians Darian Sahanaja and Nick Walusko on a punk-style fanzine called The Dumb Angel Gazette, the most comprehensive attempt to document information regarding the album. The second issue, Look! Listen! Vibrate! Smile!, featured a 300-page summary of Smile history told through press clippings, reprints of older articles, and various primary sources, as well as original commentary. Additional assistance for this issue came from David Leaf, Andy Paley, journalist Greg Shaw, and musician Probyn Gregory, a friend of Sahanaja and Walusko. Afterward, Sahanaja, Gregory, and Walusko formed the pop group Wondermints, and later, the core nucleus of Wilson's supporting band in the late 1990s and early 2000s.

According to Priore, although some "questioned the sanity behind the publication of such a huge book on an album that had never been released", the book ultimately "received accolades from Spin and Rolling Stone", as well as "positive personal reactions" from musicians such as XTC, Apples in Stereo, and former Beatle George Harrison.

Official versions

2004 – Brian Wilson Presents Smile

Wilson was able to complete a version of Smile in 2004 with the assistance of the Smile fan network that had developed since the 1970s. Following Wilson's early 2000s live performances of the Pet Sounds album, Sahanaja began suggesting Smile songs at band rehearsals, which led to plans for concerts that comprised a Smile-themed setlist. Sahanaja was assigned the role of "musical secretary" for the project and Parks was recruited to assist with the sequencing and the writing of new lyrics. Together with Wilson, they configured the presentation into three movements. Sahanaja said: "At that point, he [Brian] and Van Dyke were talking as if they were finishing Smile."

Brian Wilson Presents Smile (BWPS) premiered at the Royal Festival Hall in London in February 2004. A studio album adaptation was recorded six weeks later and released in September. Beautiful Dreamer: Brian Wilson and the Story of Smile, a documentary film by Leaf, premiered on Showtime the next month. None of Wilson's bandmates were involved with BWPS or the documentary, and none of the original recordings were used on the album. The album debuted at number 13 on the Billboard Hot 100, the highest chart position of any album by the Beach Boys or Brian Wilson since 1976's 15 Big Ones. In support of the album, Wilson embarked on a world tour that included stops in the US, Europe, and Japan.

2011 – The Smile Sessions

The Smile Sessions, released as a five-CD box set in October 2011, was the first official package dedicated to the Beach Boys' Smile. It features comprehensive session highlights and outtakes, as well as an approximation of what the completed album might have sounded like, using the 2004 version as a model. Like BWPS, many of the people involved with the making had been involved with the Beach Boys fan community for decades, including Priore and Reum, who contributed essays and were consulted for the project. The set received immediate critical acclaim, was ranked on Rolling Stones 2012 list of the "500 Greatest Albums of All Time", and won Best Historical Album at the 55th Grammy Awards.

Influence and legacy

Legend and mystique

In the decades following Smiles non-release, it became the subject of intense speculation and mystique and gained status as the most legendary unreleased album in the history of popular music. Many of the writers and "hanger-ons" who surrounded Wilson at the time were largely responsible for the mythological status later afforded the project. In October 1967, Cheetah magazine published "Goodbye Surfing, Hello God!", a memoir written by Jules Siegel that originated many of the subsequent myths and legends related to Smile. Flory credited the piece with giving "rock fans a manner in which to view Wilson as hip" as well as "venerat[ing] Smile as a relic of this hipness, intensifying audience interest in the unavailable work".

A published conversation between David Anderle and Paul Williams, serialized in Crawdaddy in 1968, was another early resource for information regarding the album. In his book How Deep Is the Ocean, Williams also included a 1997 conversation between the two. Anderle acknowledged of his role in inflating the mythology, "I guess we all do that. We all extend the story, don't we? We all extend the moment. It's satisfying. But what a burden for Brian[...]"

Responding to Anderle's statement, Siegel countered, "Brian was a genius and, if anything, I underestimated him.[...] I wasn't aware of him as a myth. I just wrote down what I saw and heard." Williams shifted his opinion on the album after having heard many of the recordings for the first time in 16 years. He felt that when "the myth" that he and Anderle had "certainly helped create" is discounted from his evaluation, the tracks "clearly" reveal themselves as "the work of someone very stoned", and that even though "there are moments of great sensitivity and deep feeling", the "overall character [...] is not at all a "heart" album (as Pet Sounds certainly is); rather it is, and was clearly meant to be, a sort of three-ring circus of flashy musical ideas and avant-garde entertainment."

During the 1970s, the perceived mystique around the project was increasingly shared by music critics. In 1983, Dave Marsh bemoaned the hype, calling it "an exercise in myth-mongering almost unparalleled in show business. Brian Wilson became a Major Artist by making music no one outside of his coterie ever heard." Writing in his 2014-published 33⅓ book about the album, Luis Sanchez opined that album's myth had since lost its power to "lure and convince" as "writers and cultists kept the story alive by rehashing hyperbole and rumor that could only take the story so far.[...] the myth itself overtook and nearly consumed the artist and the music it was about."

Bootlegs of the sessions became influential in their own right and intensified the public's interest in the album. Their proliferation in the early 1990s informed the public that the album was closer to completion than Wilson had admitted in interviews. Journalist Bill Holdship reported in 1995, "Since moving to LA, I've encountered people who are as obsessed with Smile the same way people are obsessed with the Kennedy assassination." By 1999, fans had published many essays devoted to the album through the Internet, and by the early 2000s, several books had been devoted to the album. Writing in 2002, journalist Rob Chapman summarized that the album had become "the ultimate metaphor for pop's golden age; that moment when everything seemed possible, when heaven seemed reachable". In Courrier's words, the project "became oddly influential. While functioning mostly as a rumor, when some bootlegged tracks confirmed its existence, Smile became a catalyst for records that followed in its wake." In 2011, Smile topped Uncuts list of the greatest bootleg recordings of all time.

Hypothetical release scenario
Many of the album's advocates believe that had it been released, it would have altered the group's direction and solidified their position at the vanguard of rock innovators. It may have also significantly impacted the development of concept albums, as Allan Moore argued, "it would have suggested an entirely different possible line of development for the concept album, wherein parts of tracks reappeared in others producing a form frankly far more sophisticated than any of its contemporaries." David Howard, writing in his book Sonic Alchemy, said that "Had Wilson been able to connect all the dots, Smile would most certainly be regarded as one of pop's major artistic statements, rather than an infamous, unfortunate footnote." In 2003, Ed Howard of Stylus Magazine wrote that the album "could have expanded boundaries for both the Beach Boys and pop music as a whole. Instead, for the most part it remains unheard today, and that's quite possibly the saddest fact in all of music."

Spencer Owen of Pitchfork argued that the album could have dramatically altered the course of popular music history, such that "Perhaps we wouldn't be so monotheistic in our pop leanings, worshiping only at the Beatles' altar the way some do today." In Anderle's belief, "[Smile] would have been a major influence in pop music[...] as significant if not a bigger influence than Sgt. Pepper was." Brian Boyd of The Irish Times rued that Wilson's desire to match the Beatles had contributed to the project's collapse, but also commented that since this competitive instinct was shared by his rivals, the release of Smile may have prolonged the group's break-up.

It is likely that the vast majority of the content recorded for Smile would have been left off the record due to the runtime constraints of vinyl discs. According to Linett, although contemporaries such as Frank Zappa and Bob Dylan had experimented with double albums, there is "no indication" that a multi-disc format for Smile "was ever contemplated" in 1966 or 1967. Mojos Jim Irvin challenged "the assumption that, if completed, Smile would have been perfect" and proposed that "it might have simply been considered a giant, perplexing, forty-minute 'Heroes And Villains' with some stuff about vegetables in the middle. Would it really have gone over much bigger than Van Dyke's disastrous Song Cycle a year later? Would it be inviting such brouhaha today?"

Asked in a 1987 interview whether Smile would have topped his rivals' subsequent release, Wilson replied: "No. It wouldn't have come close. Sgt. Pepper would have kicked our ass." In 1993, Mike Love said he believed Smile "would have been a great record", but in its unfinished state, is "nothing, it's just fragments". Writing in his book about Sgt. Pepper, Clinton Heylin criticized Parks' lyrics as "little more than columns of non sequiturs from a man who once swallowed a thesaurus" and decreed that much of the surviving Smile recordings "confirm that Wilson was nowhere near completing an album to rival Revolver let alone its psychedelic successor." In the opinion of Kicks co-editor Billy Miller, "nobody would have got too jazzed over electricity being invented for the second time" had Smile followed the release of Sgt. Pepper, "And it's a damn shame, too".

Reviewing the available bootlegs and officially released tracks for AllMusic, Richie Unterberger said that "numerous exquisitely beautiful passages, great ensemble singing, and brilliant orchestral pop instrumentation" were in circulation, yet "the fact is that Wilson somehow lacked the discipline needed to combine them into a pop masterpiece that was both brilliant and commercial." Former Record Collector editor Peter Doggett states that Smile would most likely have had the same reception as that afforded Song Cycle – namely, critical acclaim but a commercial disaster. He wrote that the release of Smile "would surely have set the Beatles back for months while they considered a suitable reply[...] But it wouldn't have been commercial, in the way that the Doors, or Love, or Jefferson Airplane were."

Innovations

With Smile, Wilson anticipated editing practices that were not common until the digital age. "In a way", engineer Mark Linett said, "Brian invented the method of modular recording that we take for granted today." The album cover – considered to be among the most legendary in rock music, according to Priore – would have been one of the earliest instances of a popular music group featuring original commissioned artwork. Paul Williams argued that, with Smile, Wilson had become one of the earliest pioneers of sampling. Priore wrote that Wilson "manipulated sound effects in a way that would later be extremely successful when Pink Floyd released The Dark Side of the Moon in 1973, the best-selling album of the entire progressive rock period".

Sanchez offered his view of the project as a "radical" expansion of "the glow and sui generis vision" of Pet Sounds, one which "presents itself with a kind of directness that is unlike anything else in popular music". Ed Masley of AZ Central wrote that Smile "doesn't sound like" many other pop albums that were considered to be the vanguard of the "psychedelic revolution[...] but it clearly shares their spirit of adventure in a way that would have been unthinkable just two years earlier." Ed Howard wrote that the album's "arty experimentation", "exotic, often surprising arrangements", and "twisting wordplay" was "arguably" more innovative than contemporary work by the Beatles.

In 1999, Freaky Trigger wrote that Smile was not "the best album ever", but that it is "astoundingly original" and "tangible evidence of an alternative rock history which turned out differently". In 2011, despite its chosen focus being "new American music that is outside the commercial mainstream", online publication NewMusicBox made an exception with Smile, citing its standing as "an album recorded more than 45 years ago by one of the biggest (and most financially lucrative) musical acts of all time". The site's reviewer, Frank Oteri, wrote:  Oteri concluded that "the same pride of place in American music history held by other great innovators" such as Charles Ives, George Gershwin, John Cage, John Coltrane, and James Brown would "probably" never include Smile, since, "For many people, the Beach Boys will always be perceived as a light-hearted party band that drooled over 'California Girls' while on a 'Surfing Safari'."

Alternative music

Smile was influential to indie rock and its mythology became a touchstone for chamber pop and the more art-inclined branches of post-punk.  In Priore's estimation, the "alternate-rock" generation began embracing Smile after the early 1990s. In 2002, Chapman remarked that he had "yet to meet an ambient or electronica artist who doesn't have a soundfile full of Smile bytes".

The Elephant 6 Recording Company, a collective of bands that includes Apples in Stereo, the Olivia Tremor Control, Neutral Milk Hotel, Beulah, Elf Power, and of Montreal, was founded through a mutual admiration of 1960s pop music, with Smile being "their Holy Grail". Will Cullen Hart appreciated "the idea of the sections, each of them being a colorful world within itself. [Wilson's] stuff could be so cinematic and then he could just drop down to a toy piano going plink, plink, plink and then, when you least expect it, it can fly back into a million gorgeous voices." According to Kevin Barnes, of Montreal's album Coquelicot Asleep in the Poppies: A Variety of Whimsical Verse (2001) was partly based on Smile.

Released exclusively in Japan, the 1998 tribute album Smiling Pets featured cover versions of Pet Sounds and Smile tracks by artists such as the Olivia Tremor Control, Jim O'Rourke, and Sonic Youth's Thurston Moore. Trey Spruance, who recorded a version of "Good Vibrations" for the album, said that Smile "definitely" influenced the Mr. Bungle album California (1999), "especially when it comes to the Faustian scale of it." The cover artwork for Velvet Crush's Teenage Symphonies to God (1994) was based on the Smile cover.

Kevin Shields of My Bloody Valentine said that his band's 2013 album MBV was inspired by the modular approach of Smile. Priore believed that the Smile recordings influenced albums such as XTC's Oranges & Lemons (1989), the High Llamas' Gideon Gaye (1994) and Hawaii (1996), the Flaming Lips' The Soft Bulletin (1999), Mercury Rev's All Is Dream (2001), the Apples in Stereo's Her Wallpaper Reverie (1999), Heavy Blinkers' 2000 eponymous LP, and the Thrills' So Much for the City (2003).

Unfinished state and interactivity

There remains no definitive form or content of Smile, and whether Smile should be considered an "album" has itself been challenged.  Quoted in Leaf's 1978 biography, Anderle felt that Smile should be viewed not as an album, but an epoch that includes Pet Sounds and "Good Vibrations". Heiser wrote, "Possibly the best term offered yet to describe the project is: 'sonic menagerie'", a term used by co-producer Dennis Wolfe in the liner notes of The Smile Sessions. Priore had long suggested that the album was virtually finished in 1967, however, Ed Howard contended: "Smile was, simply put, nowhere near finished[...] Furthermore, any effort to guess at what the album might have sounded like would be nothing more than conjecture.[...] it's likely that [Brian] himself didn't have a clear, constant, single idea for the album".

Upon the release of BWPS, critics popularly viewed Smile as "finally completed". In his review of The Smile Sessions, Toop argued that such attempts to complete the album are "misguided". He described Smile as a "labyrinth" that exists "in a memory house into which Wilson invited all those who could externalize its elements". Freaky Trigger shared a similar view, writing: "There is no 'correct' track sequence, there is no completed album, because Smile isn't a linear progression of tracks. As a collection of modular melodic ideas it is by nature organic and resists being bookended." Toop said the project's demise and film-like editing process also "parallels the great lost projects by Orson Welles, Erich Von Stroheim and Sergei Eisenstein." Howard supported that the material "is best heard as a movie reel on the making of a record: multiple takes of each song, with no definitive version."

Academic Larry Starr opined that "the idea there could be a 'definitive' Smile decades after Brian Wilson abandoned the project was always chimerical". He added, "Those whimsically inclined might suggest that Smile's apparent malleability could represent just one additional illustration of the extent to which it was ahead of its time." In a 2004 conversation with Wilson, Parks suggested that, with Smile, the pair may have inadvertently created the first ever interactive album.

In popular culture
Lewis Shiner's 1991 science fiction novel Glimpses contains a chapter in which the protagonist travels back in time to November 1966 and helps Wilson complete Smile.
The 2007 comedy film Walk Hard: The Dewey Cox Story contains a segment inspired by the Smile saga, in which the protagonist is consumed with recording his "masterpiece" (titled “Black Sheep”) and suffers a mental breakdown.

Reconstruction track listings
All tracks written by Brian Wilson and Van Dyke Parks, except where noted.

Notes

References

Bibliography

Further reading
Contemporary articles
 
 
 
 
 
 
 

Web articles
 
 
 
 
 
 
 
 

Journals
 
 
 

Books

External links
 
 1966 and 1967 Smile sessionography
 
 
 

1960s in American music
1967 in American music
1966 in American music
Albums produced by Brian Wilson
Albums arranged by Brian Wilson
Albums conducted by Brian Wilson
Americana albums
Capitol Records albums
Concept albums
Experimental rock albums by American artists
Folk rock albums by American artists
Progressive pop albums
Psychedelic rock albums by American artists
Psychedelic pop albums
Unreleased albums
Albums recorded at Gold Star Studios
Albums recorded at United Western Recorders
The Beach Boys bootleg recordings
Unfinished albums
Art pop albums
Avant-pop albums